Abdul Mannan Bhuiyan (3 January 1943 – 28 July 2010) was a Bangladeshi politician of Bangladesh Nationalist Party.

Early life
Bhuiyan was born on 3 January 1943, at his maternal grandfather's house at Asad Nagar village under Mashimpur Union of Shibpur Upazila in Narsingdi District. His elementary education commenced at a village primary school. He passed Matriculation examination from Shibpur High School and the Higher Secondary Certificate examination from Narsingdi College. He earned his bachelor's and master's from the Department of History at the University of Dhaka.

Political career
After Bhuiyan had finished studies, Bhuiyan was briefly involved in teaching. He started his political life as an activist of Chhatra Union (Students' Union). Due to his involvement in left-oriented student politics, he was imprisoned before his degree examination. He was elected social welfare secretary of Narsingdi College Student Union in 1960. He played the role of a pioneer in the anti-Ayub movement in 1962 as one of the organizers of the then East Pakistan Chhatra Union. He was elected the organizinging secretary of East Pakistan Chhatra Union in 1964 and held the post of its general secretary for the next two years.

Bhuiyan was elected executive member of "Dhaka University Central Students Union" (DUCSU) in 1964–65. After completion of his student life he joined the National Awami Party (NAP) led by Maulana Bhashani. He played a significant role in the mass upsurge in 1969. During the Liberation War of Bangladesh in 1971, Bhuiyan put up resistance against the Pakistani occupation forces by organising thousands of local freedom fighters. He announced a vast area including Shibpur of Narsingdi free and operated from there as a commander. He was general secretary of Krishak Samity for a long time under the leadership of Maulana Bhashani. The movement for improving the condition of deprived farmers commenced under Bhuiyan's leadership.

Bhuiyan left NAP and became general secretary of United People's Party (UPP) in 1978. Later on request of the then president Ziaur Rahman he joined Bangladesh Nationalist Party in 1980. Zia nominated Bhuiyan as the convener of Jatiyatabadi Krishak Dal. He also became the agriculture secretary of BNP central committee. Mannan Bhuiyan was also an organiser of the movement against autocratic Ershad. He acted as the Bangladesh Nationalist Party joint secretary for eight and a half years since 1988.

Bhuiyan was appointed as state minister for Labour and Manpower in 1991 and then as a cabinet minister given the charge of food and agriculture.

On 26 June 1996, Khaleda Zia nominated Bhuiyan as the secretary general of the party. His foremost task was to reorganise the party, which he successfully carried out. Bhuiyan was the longest serving secretary general of Bangladesh Nationalist Party for 11 years.

Bhuiyan faced the toughest time during his secretary general tenure in Bangladesh Nationalist Party as the hardliners and anti-liberation elements within and outside the party strongly opposed a communist leader's becoming Bangladesh Nationalist Party's second man. He was Member of parliament for 15 years and served as Bangladesh Nationalist Party's longest serving secretary general. He was secretary general for 11 years before expelled by Khaleda Zia in September 2007. He served as Labor and Manpower minister (1991–2005) and the LGRD and Cooperatives minister (2001–2006) of the BNP-led government. He was a member of the Jatiya Sangshad at seat number 199, and local government of Narsingdi (3). He was elected Member of Parliament four times back to back since the 5th Jatiya Sangsad in 1991.

Expelled from secretary role
BNP Chairperson Khaleda Zia had expelled Bhuiyan and Joint general secretary Ashraf Hossain from their respective posts in September 2007. Khandaker Delwar Hossain replaced Bhuiyan's position.

Personal life and death
Bhuiyan was married to Mariam Begum (1948-2021), a former principal of Dhaka College. Together they had two sons, Bhuiyan Anindya Mohaimen Rajon and Bhuiyan Nandito Nahiyan Swajon.

References

1943 births
2010 deaths
People from Narsingdi District
Bangladesh Nationalist Party politicians
General Secretaries of Bangladesh Nationalist Party
5th Jatiya Sangsad members
6th Jatiya Sangsad members
7th Jatiya Sangsad members
8th Jatiya Sangsad members
Labour and Employment ministers of Bangladesh
Local Government, Rural Development and Co-operatives ministers